Rafe Furst is an entrepreneur, impact investor, writer, producer and poker player. He is co-founder of Crowdfunder and advises many projects that involve technology and social entrepreneurship.  Furst has spoken about transformation of early-stage finance at TED, and in 2006, he won a World Series of Poker Championship Bracelet. A 2011 book titled, Shake the World featuring Furst along with other business and non-profit leaders, described him as a "twenty-first century polymath."

Education and early career
Furst holds an M.S. in Computer Science and B.S. in Symbolic Systems, both from Stanford University.

Furst began his career as an artificial intelligence researcher at the Kestrel Institute.  Furst left academia to co-found his first company, Pick'em Sports, in 1996, which was sold to a public company in 1999.

Entrepreneurship and angel investing
After the success of Pick'em Sports, Furst helped launch and run several other ventures, including Expert Insight, an instructional media company which won several awards but was ultimately unsuccessful in the marketplace.

Furst has invested in, mentored, and advised many well known startups and social enterprises, including Mobotory, Skillshare and HUB LA.

In 2011, after his investment in the early crowdfunding platform ProFounder closed its doors, Furst joined up with fellow Los Angeles entrepreneur Chance Barnett to launch Crowdfunder, where Furst is the SVP of Business Development.

Philanthropy and mentorship
Furst served on the board of directors at the Prevent Cancer Foundation and Conrad Foundation; the Board of Advisors at Decision Education Foundation and Unreasonable Institute and has served as a Mentor at Sandbox, StartingBloc, and Thiel Fellowship.

In 2003, Furst and his friend Phil Gordon launched the Bad Beat on Cancer initiative which encourages poker players to pledge 1% of their winnings to prevent cancer.  Since inception, Bad Beat on Cancer has raised over $3.8 million.  In 2007, Furst received the award for Excellence in Cancer Awareness, and in March 2010, Furst received the 2nd Annual Cancer Champion Award.

Furst teamed up with his friend Kim Scheinberg in 2010 to launch Presumed Abundance a new type of venture philanthropy fund which holds its profits in trust for the social entrepreneurs it has funded, in order that they may later "fund it forward."

Community curation
Furst curates a community called Accelerating Possibilities which "connects ideas, people and resources to make good things happen faster."  In a few years, the community has grown from several close friends to over 1,700 members.

Furst is also an active member of the TED community and has sponsored over a dozen first-time attendees through a program he dubbed "TED Forward", in which recipients agree to similarly sponsor others in the future.

Science and philosophy
Furst's blog, The Emergent Fool, explores topics in complex adaptive systems ranging from cancer to economics, psychology, technology and the limits of science.  Some of his ideas have been picked up and written about by Freakonomics and New York Times Magazine.

In October 2009, Furst wrote about an experiment he and Phil Gordon undertook to invest in the lifetime future income of Furst's brother-in-law, filmmaker Jon Gunn.  The blog entry went viral and was picked up by Wired and Reuters, and soon there were others who began selling portions of their future income stream.  Furst spoke in 2010 at the TEDActive Conference about the experiment, and by 2012 several efforts were underway to commercialize the concept.  Furst became an advisor to the business startup Pave, which has adapted and refined Furst's initial concept.

Furst has devoted a good portion of his writing and thinking to the question of why cancer mortality rates have not improved in the U.S., despite the billions of dollars spent each year on research, treatment and the search for a cure.  Though not formally trained in oncology or biology, Furst is well-respected in the cancer research community and been invited to participate in cancer conferences and gatherings at the Santa Fe Institute, Van Andel Institute, UCSF Medical Center, Summit Series and X Prize Foundation.

Poker player
Furst began playing poker in middle school and started a home poker game while at Stanford that continues to this day.  The group, calling themselves The Tiltboys, became known for their gambling antics and published a book in 2005 titled Tales From the Tiltboys.

Several Tiltboys, including Furst, have had success on the professional poker circuit.  In 2005, Furst won the Ultimate Poker Challenge. One year later,  he won a World Series of Poker event in Pot-Limit Hold'em.  All told, Furst has won or cashed in 13 professional tournaments.

Furst was an investor and founder of Full Tilt Poker, which eventually became the world's second largest online poker site. Furst was a sponsored player on the site and could be seen sporting the Full Tilt Poker logo often in televised events and interviews between 2005 and 2010.  On September 20, 2011, Furst was named as a defendant in a complaint by the U.S. Department of Justice against Tiltware, LLC, the parent company of Full Tilt Poker.  On November 28, 2012, Furst settled the case, and while the exact settlement amount is unknown, the agreement stipulates no liability for Furst, and the case was dismissed with prejudice.

Beginning with the Bad Beat on Cancer initiative in 2003, Furst has hosted or appeared in many charity poker events benefiting causes such as Talk About Curing Autism, Ante Up for Africa, and XPRIZE Foundation.

Furst is also a prolific poker teacher and author, having coached celebrities for Celebrity Poker Showdown, written chapters in the Full Tilt Poker Strategy Guide, and produced Expert Insight: Final Table Poker.

Adventure travel
Furst is known as an extreme sports amateur enthusiast and posts pictures and videos of his exploits heli-skiing, snowboarding, and kitesurfing to his Twitter and Facebook feeds.  An adventure travel guide written by a family friend features a chapter about backpacking in the High Sierras with Furst.

After the dot com bubble burst in 2000, Furst spent three years traveling the world full-time, culminating in a year-long sport road trip with Phil Gordon, titled the Ultimate Sports Adventure.

References

External links
Rafe Furst's Official Site

American poker players
World Series of Poker bracelet winners
Living people
Year of birth missing (living people)